Obu or OBU may refer to:

Japan-related topics
 Obu Toramasa (1504–1565), Japanese samurai
 Ōbu, a city in the Aichi prefecture
 Ōbu Station, a railway station in the city of Ōbu

Educational institutions
 Oxford Brookes University, Oxford, England
 United States:
 Oklahoma Baptist University
 Ouachita Baptist University

Finance
Offshore banking, also known as Offshore Banking Unit

Trade unionism
 One Big Union (Canada)
 One Big Union (concept)
 Operative Builders' Union, early British union federation

Other uses
 obu, ISO 639-3 code for Obulom language of Nigeria
 On-Board Unit for implementing Italian toll-highway Telepass 
 Open Bitstream Unit in the AOMedia Video 1 (AV1) specification